Ryan William Bates (born (February 14, 1997) is an American football offensive guard for the Buffalo Bills of the National Football League (NFL). He played college football at Penn State.

Early life
Bates attended Archbishop Wood Catholic High School in Warminster Township, Pennsylvania.

Professional career

Philadelphia Eagles
Bates signed with the Philadelphia Eagles as an undrafted free agent on May 10, 2019.

Buffalo Bills
On August 9, 2019, Bates was traded to the Buffalo Bills for linebacker Eli Harold.

Bates made his first career start in Week 16 of the 2021 season at right guard, and started the remainder of the season and through the playoffs at left guard.

On March 14, 2022, the Bills placed a restricted free agent tender on Bates. On March 24, 2022, the Chicago Bears signed Bates to an offer sheet, but Buffalo matched the offer. On April 4, 2022, the Bills signed Bates to a four-year $17 million contract.

References

External links
Buffalo Bills bio
Penn State Nittany Lions bio

1997 births
Living people
American football offensive tackles
Penn State Nittany Lions football players
Buffalo Bills players
People from Warminster, Pennsylvania
Players of American football from Pennsylvania
Sportspeople from Bucks County, Pennsylvania